Toonerville Folks ( The Toonerville Trolley That Meets All the Trains) was a popular newspaper cartoon feature by Fontaine Fox, which ran from 1908 to 1955. It began in 1908 in the Chicago Post, and by 1913, it was syndicated nationally by the Wheeler Syndicate. From the 1930s on, it was distributed by the McNaught Syndicate.

Characters and story
The single-panel gag cartoon (with longer-form comics on Sunday) was a daily look at Toonerville, situated in what are now called the suburbs. Central to the strip was the rickety little trolley called the "Toonerville Trolley that met all the trains", driven in a frenzy by the grizzly old Skipper to meet each commuter train as it arrived in town. A few of the many richly formed characters included Suitcase Simpson, Mickey McGuire, the Powerful Katrinka, the Terrible Tempered Mr. Bang, Aunt Eppie Hogg, Little Woo-Woo Wortle, The Little Scorpions, and "Stinky" Davis.

Origin
Fox described the inspiration for the cartoon series in an article he wrote for The Saturday Evening Post titled "A Queer Way to Make a Living" (February 11, 1928, page six):
After years of gestation, the idea for the Toonerville Trolley was born one day up in Westchester County when my wife and I had left New York City to visit Charlie Voight, the cartoonist, in the Pelhams. At the station, we saw a rattletrap of a streetcar, which had as its crew and skipper a wistful old codger with an Airedale beard. He showed as much concern in the performance of his job as you might expect from Captain Hartley when docking the Leviathan.

Films
Between 1920 and 1922, 17 Toonerville silent film comedy adaptations were scripted by Fox for Philadelphia's Betzwood Film Company. These starred Dan Mason as the Skipper with Wilna Hervey as Katrinka. Only seven of those 17 shorts survive today. Four are preserved in the Betzwood Film Archive at Montgomery County Community College, Blue Bell, Pennsylvania.

'1920'
	The Toonerville Trolley
'1921'
	The Skipper's Treasure Scheme
	Skipper's Flirtation
	Toonerville Tangle
	The Skipper Strikes It Rich
	Toonerville Tactics
	The Skipper's Narrow Escape
	The Skipper Has His Fling
	The Skipper's Scheme
	Toonerville's 'Boozem' Friends
	Toonerville Follies
	Toonerville's Fire Brigade
	The Skipper's Treasure Garden
'1922'
	The Skipper's Sermon
	Toonerville Topics
	Toonerville Blues
	Toonerville Trials
	The Skipper's Policy

Mickey Rooney starred as Mickey McGuire in more than 55 comedy shorts filmed between 1927 and 1936. Rooney (né Joe Yule, Jr.) adopted the professional name Mickey McGuire for a time before finally settling on the last name Rooney.

The first of three Van Beuren Studios Rainbow Parade animated cartoons adapted from the syndicated panels was released by RKO Radio Pictures on January 17, 1936. Some of those became available on laserdisc in 1994 and later, on DVD from Image Entertainment in 1999. Katrinka was animated by Joseph Barbera.

A Toonerville Trolley cartoon, "Lost and Found", was included in Simple Gifts, a Christmas collection of six animated shorts shown on PBS TV in 1977.

Over the years, various Toonerville characters acted as spokesmen for popular products of the day. Skipper, Flem Proddy and Katrinka appeared throughout the decades in advertisements for Drano, Kellogg's cereals and Chef Boyardee foods.

Reprints

Between 1934 and 1940, comic book reprints of the panel appeared in many issues of All-American Comics, Famous Funnies, and Popular Comics. In 1995, the strip was one of 20 included in the Comic Strip Classics series of commemorative United States postage stamps.

In 1972, Herb Galewitz and Don Winslow compiled Fontaine Fox's Toonerville Trolley, a 184-page book of daily panels, for Weathervane Books, an imprint of Charles Scribner's Sons.

Theatrical cartoon shorts
Three Toonerville cartoons were produced by Van Beuren Studios in 1936 as part of the Rainbow Parade series.

In popular usage
"Toonerville Trolley" has been used as a nickname for various specific trolleys in towns and cities across the United States and Canada.

The trolley that took tourists from the nearest town to the Seattle City Light hydroelectric project on the Skagit River in Washington State in the early years of the project (~1920-1938) was called the "Toonerville Trolley".

The 1933 musical revue As Thousands Cheer featured the Toonerville Trolley in a number called 'The Funnies' honoring comic strip characters.

Stephen King had a character in Pet Sematary refer to a drug trip on Tuinals as a ride on the "Toonerville Trolley".

In William Gass' Middle C, the main character lists some of the kinds of people he doesn't like, including "the nutsy fagans and other detrolleyed toonervilles".

Toonerville was mentioned by an onlooker in the Emergency! episode "Parade" in reference to an impromptu rescue with a vintage fire engine.

A Toonerville Trolley toy is shown briefly in Rintaro's segment in the 1987 anime anthology Neo Tokyo.

The powerful Katrinka appeared in Gasoline Alley on November 6, 2015 and helped explain the uproar about Jeff at the Old Comics Home.

1960s rock band The Electric Prunes featured a song called 'The Toonerville Trolley' honoring the comic strip on their self-titled debut album.

From 1977-2018, there was a "Toonerville Trolley" record store in Williamstown, MA.

References

External links

Fontaine Fox mss. at Indiana University
Toonopedia
Strickler, Dave. Syndicated Comic Strips and Artists, 1924–1995: The Complete Index. Cambria, California: Comics Access, 1995. 

American comic strips
1908 comics debuts
Gag-a-day comics
Fictional American people
American comics characters
Male characters in comics
Comics characters introduced in 1908
1955 comics endings
American comics adapted into films
Comics adapted into animated series
Fiction about rail transport
Van Beuren Studios